"Rolling Home" is a Christmas-themed song by Swedish band Rednex, released in December 1995 as the last single from their debut album, Sex & Violins. A black-and-white music video was also made to accompany it.

Critical reception
Pan-European magazine Music & Media wrote that "legendary ABBA producer Tretow has turned this Dolly Parton-like album track into a splashing Christmas song with a great abundance of sleighbells, drums and choir boys. Note the unexpected twist at the end. This one is sure to break some borders in December."

Track listing
 "Rolling Home (Tretow's Treatment - Radio)" - 4:41
 "Rolling Home (Tretow's Treatment - Long)" - 6:30
 "Bottleneck Bob (Run Like Hell Mix)" - 3:39
 "The Ultimate Rednex Mega Mix - Old Pop In An Oak" - 1:08
 "The Ultimate Rednex Mega Mix - Wish You Were Here" - 0:23
 "The Ultimate Rednex Mega Mix - Cotton Eye Joe" - 1:00
 "The Ultimate Rednex Mega Mix - Riding Alone" - 0:51
 "The Ultimate Rednex Mega Mix - Fat Sally Lee" - 1:00
 "The Ultimate Rednex Mega Mix - Wild 'N' Free" - 1:23
 "Old Pop in an Oak (DJ Cerla + Moratto Remix)" - 5:08
 "Old Pop in an Oak (One More Mix)" - 4:52

Charts

References

1994 songs
1995 singles
Rednex songs
Swedish Christmas songs
Songs written by Pat Reiniz
Black-and-white music videos